WSOY may refer to:

 Werner Söderström Osakeyhtiö, a Finnish publishing company founded in 1878, now part of Bonnier Group.
 WSOY (AM), a radio station (1340 AM) licensed to Decatur, Illinois, United States
 WSOY-FM, a radio station (102.9 FM) licensed to Decatur, Illinois, United States